Henry English "Hank" Braden IV (August 24, 1944 – July 15, 2013) was a lawyer and politician.

Born in New Orleans, Louisiana, Braden received his bachelors degree from Le Moyne College and his law degree from the Loyola University New Orleans College of Law. He then practiced law and was a lobbyist. Braden was involved with New Orleans Poverty Agency and the New Orleans Urban League as executive director. In 1974-1975, Braden was director for Manpower and Development for the city of New Orleans. Braden then served in the Louisiana House of Representatives as a Democrat 1978-1984. He died in New Orleans, Louisiana.

References

1944 births
2013 deaths
American lobbyists
Democratic Party Louisiana state senators
St. Augustine High School (New Orleans) alumni
Le Moyne College alumni
Loyola University New Orleans College of Law alumni
Politicians from New Orleans
Activists for African-American civil rights
African-American activists
African-American state legislators in Louisiana
Lawyers from New Orleans
20th-century American lawyers
21st-century African-American people